Nakis Avgerinos (1911 – November 4, 2002) was a Greek politician.

He was born in Pyrgos, Elis, the son of Charalampos Avgerinos, mayor of Pyrgos, a relative of the old Pyrgiotiki family dominated local politics for over a century. Avgerinos studied in Athens and became a judge in Patras and later in Pyrgos. In the 1946 election, he was elected MP for the Liberal Party and in 1956 for the Liberal Democratic Union. He was voted several times as a member of parliament for Elis.

He died on November 4, 2002, in Athens. He had a daughter named Chrysafoula.  He was the last line of the historic Avgerino family.

References
The first version of the article is translated and is based from the article at the Greek Wikipedia (el:Main Page)

1911 births
2002 deaths
People from Pyrgos, Elis
Nakis
Liberal Democratic Union (Greece) politicians
Greek MPs 1946–1950
Greek MPs 1956–1958
Politicians from Elis
National and Kapodistrian University of Athens alumni